Jacob Duehring (born ) is an American male track cyclist. 
omnium event at the 2014 and 2015 UCI Track Cycling World Championships.

References

External links
 Profile at cyclingarchives.com

1985 births
Living people
American track cyclists
American male cyclists
Place of birth missing (living people)